This is a list of people elected to the Legislative Assembly of the Gold Coast on 15 June 1954. Unlike the previous Legislative Assembly, all members were elected directly by the general population. The membership was also increased to 104.

Composition

List of MPs elected in the general election
The following table is a list of MPs elected in the Gold Coast 1954 election.
Some notable politicians lost their seats in this election. These include four members of The Big Six. The first was Emmanuel Obetsebi-Lamptey who lost out to Kwame Nkrumah in Accra Central. The next was J. B. Danquah, a founding member of the United Gold Coast Convention and now a member of the Ghana Congress Party who lost to a relative, Aaron Ofori-Atta. A third member of the Big Six, William Ofori Atta of the GCP failed to keep his Akim Abuakwa West seat. The fourth was Edward Akufo-Addo who lost the Akwapim South election. The former wife of J. B. Danquah, Mabel Dove Danquah (divorced in 1941) became the first female in the country to be elected when she won the Ga (rural) seat, beating Nii Amaa Ollennu. Kweku Bankole Awooner-Renner, leader of the Muslim Association Party failed to win the Accra West seat.

Notes and references

See also
 Parliament of Ghana
 1954 Gold Coast legislative election

External links and sources
 African Elections Database
 The electoral victories and shock losses of the 1954 Gold Coast election

1954
Ghanaian MPs 1954–1956